Maude Fulton (May 14, 1881 – November 9, 1950) was an American actress, playwright, stage director, theater manager, and later a Hollywood screenwriter.

Early life
Born in 1881 in El Dorado, Kansas, she was the daughter of newspaperman Titus Parker Fulton and Lulu Belle Couchman. She grew up in El Dorado, Kansas and Lexington, Missouri, and worked as a stenographer, telegraph operator, and short story writer before becoming an actress. She first appeared on the stage in amateur productions in Aberdeen, South Dakota in 1904.

Career 
On the opening night of Fulton's Broadway debut, in the cast of Mam'zelle Champagne (1906), Harry K. Thaw murdered architect Stanford White over the affections of Evelyn Nesbit.

In all, Fulton acted or danced in seven Broadway shows. She also appeared in vaudeville with William Rock, whom she met when he choreographed her on Broadway in The Orchid (1907) and appeared with her in Funabashi (1908) and The Candy Shop (1909).

Fulton's greatest personal success was the 1917 play The Brat, which ran for 136 performances. Written by Fulton, it was produced by Oliver Morosco, starred Fulton and John Findlay, and featured Lewis Stone and Edmund Lowe. The Brat was made into a 1919 silent picture starring Alla Nazimova, a John Ford talkie in 1931, and again as The Girl From Avenue A in 1940, with Jane Withers, Elyse Knox, and Laura Hope Crews.

She wrote another play, The Humming Bird, which opened on Broadway in 1923. It starred Fulton and Hilda Spong, and was directed by and featured her then-husband Robert Ober.

During the silent era, Fulton wrote the intertitles for many  pictures such as Lady Windermere's Fan (1925) with Ronald Colman and Don Juan (1926) with John Barrymore. She continued writing for films in Hollywood through the 1930s, with writing credits on a total of 21 pictures and acting credits on five.

Personal life 
Fulton and Ober were married from 1920–26, and had no children.

Death
She died on November 9, 1950 in a San Fernando, California hospital, aged 69.

References

External links

 
Maude Fulton photo gallery, Univ. of Washington, sayre collection
Maude Fulton portrait gallery at NY Public Library, Billy Rose Collection
Maude Fulton, findagrave.com 
Profile, nytimes.com; accessed February 20, 2016.
portrait probably 1920s rather than 1920 as listed  ...accessible window version

1881 births
1950 deaths
People from El Dorado, Kansas
Actresses from Kansas
American stage actresses
Vaudeville performers
20th-century American actresses
20th-century American dramatists and playwrights
Screenwriters from Kansas
20th-century American screenwriters